William Albert Mulcahy (born 7 January 1935 in Rathkeale, County Limerick, Ireland) is a retired Irish rugby union player. He represented UL Bohemians R.F.C. University College Dublin R.F.C., Bective Rangers, Skerries RFC, Leinster, Ireland and the British and Irish Lions. He was educated at St Munchin's College, Limerick.

UCD
Mulcahy, along with teammate Niall Brophy, became the first players from UCD to represent the British and Irish Lions (then known as the British Lions) during their 1959 tour to Australia and New Zealand.

Ireland
Mulcahy made his debut for Ireland against Australia on 18 January 1958. His last match for Ireland was against South Africa on 10 April 1965. He was part of Ireland's team when they recorded first test victories against Australia (1958) and South Africa (1965).

British and Irish Lions
Mulcahy received his first Lions call-up in 1959 to tour Australia and New Zealand. He played in 15 out of the 33 tour games, and earned 2 test caps, one against Australia on 6 June and the other against New Zealand on 19 September. He toured with the Lions again on their 1962 tour to South Africa. Mulcahy played in 17 out of the 24 tour games, including all four of the tests.

After rugby
After retiring from rugby, Mulcahy became an Administrator, and went on to become President of the Leinster Branch in 1995–96, the first President from Skerries RFC.

He was inducted into the Guinness Hall of Fame in 2009.

References

External links
St Munchin's College
 IRFU Profile
Lions Profile
ESPN Profile

Living people
1935 births
Rugby union players from County Limerick
Irish rugby union players
UL Bohemians R.F.C. players
University College Dublin R.F.C. players
Bective Rangers players
Skerries RFC players
Leinster Rugby players
Ireland international rugby union players
British & Irish Lions rugby union players from Ireland
Rugby union locks
People educated at St Munchin's College